The Mansakan languages are a group of Austronesian languages spoken in the Philippines. Dabawenyo is the principal native language of the Davao region; however, there is a high degree of bilingualism in Cebuano among their speakers. Most speakers have shifted to Cebuano today.

Classification

Overview
The Mansakan languages are:

Dabawenyo
Mandayan
Mansaka
Mandaya
Kamayo
Kalagan (a dialect cluster)
Mamanwa

Gallman (1974)
The Mansakan subgrouping below is from Gallman (1974).

Individual languages are marked by italics, and primary branches by bold italics.

Mansakan
North Mansakan
Kamayo North and Kamayo South
Dabaw
Dabawenyo (Davaoeño)
Eastern Mansakan
Isamal
Caraga (Karaga)
Kabasagan, Boso, Mansaka, Mandayan
Western Mansakan
Kalagan and Tagakaolo
Mamanwa

References

 
Central Philippine languages